Hubert Van Nerom (born 24 May 1908, date of death unknown) was a Belgian Olympic fencer. He competed in the team sabre event at the 1936 Summer Olympics.

References

1908 births
Year of death missing
Belgian male fencers
Belgian sabre fencers
Olympic fencers of Belgium
Fencers at the 1936 Summer Olympics